(stylized in all caps as ONE OK ROCK) is a Japanese rock band, formed in Tokyo, Japan, in 2005. Originally five members, the band currently consists of vocalist Takahiro Moriuchi, guitarist and bandleader Toru Yamashita, bassist Ryota Kohama, and drummer Tomoya Kanki. Former members include drummer Yu Koyanagi and guitarist Alexander “Alex” Reimon Onizawa. They play varied styles of music, with songs ranging from alternative rock and emo to post-hardcore and pop punk.

One Ok Rock was affiliated originally with Amuse, Inc. ever since their debut in 2007. The band left Amuse on April 1, 2021 and established their own management agency, named 10969 Inc. In the United States, they are signed with record label Fueled by Ramen.

The band's name comes from "one o'clock", the time that the band used to practice their music on weekends. They chose to play at one o'clock in the morning because it was cheaper to use the rehearsal space during such hours. However, noticing that the Japanese language made no distinction between R's and L's, "O'CLOCK" transformed into "O'CROCK" or "O'KROCK", which later transformed into "OK ROCK". In addition, One Ok Rock can be expressed as "10969" (wan-ō-ku-ro-ku). The band uses both Japanese and English lyrics in their songs.

One Ok Rock rose to international fame with their 2012 single "The Beginning" from their sixth album Jinsei×Boku=, which led them to concerts and music festivals outside Asia. Following the success, the band started to release their later albums in two versions (Japanese-English and full English) with 2 to 3 different tracks in each version. Their seventh studio album, 35xxxv, became their first album which charted on US Billboard. It peaked at No. 11 on Heatseekers Albums, No. 43 on Independent Albums, No. 23 on the Hard Rock Albums, and No. 1 on the World Albums Chart. The band's eighth album, Ambitions, debuted at No. 106 on the US Billboard 200 and international charts while incorporating more arena rock and pop-rock. In 2019, the band adopted a more electronic and pop sound on their ninth album Eye of the Storm. In 2022, they experimented with more rock-centered sound while still incorporating modern pop-rock for their new album, Luxury Disease.

One Ok Rock won Classic Rock Roll of Honour Awards for Eastern Breakthrough Male Band in 2016, and Rock Sound Awards for Best International Band in 2017 and Best Live Performance in 2018. The band was also nominated for two Alternative Press Music Awards – Best International Band in 2016 and Best Breakthrough Band in 2017.

History

2005–2006: Formation and early releases 

The foundation for One Ok Rock began on July 29, 2005, when Toru Yamashita, a high school student, wanted to start a band. He invited his childhood friend Ryota Kohama, who was also a member of the hip-hop dance group HEADS they were both in years prior. He told Ryota to learn the bass and asked Alexander Onizawa, who was their senior in school, to join to be their guitarist and his classmate, Yu Koyanagi, to play drums. Toru was searching for a vocalist and found Takahiro Moriuchi, who was in another band performing. Impressed by Taka’s singing skill, Toru insisted him to join One Ok Rock instead. At first, Taka refused despite repeated attempts to sway him, but eventually, he joined the band. The band released their self-produced demo CD “Do You Know A Christmas?”. On December 21, 2005. There were only 200 copies of the CD. In 2006, they released 2 EPs, ONE OK ROCK and KEEP IT REAL. After signing with Amuse, Inc. Yu Koyanagi left the band to pursue an acting career and replaced by Tomoya Kanki who was a student at the ESP (Musical Academy) and was already in a band that was not going well. He then joined One Ok Rock in 2006 and became an official member when they debuted in 2007.

2007–2009: Debut album, Beam of Light, Kanjo Effect and departure of Alex 
In 2007, the band released their debut single, "Naihishinsho", reached number 48 on the Oricon Charts and sold 15,000 copies. Followed by their second and third single, " Yume Yume" and "Et Cetera" , followed that success and charted at number 43. After those singles, they released their debut album Zeitakubyō on November 21, 2007, and had their first tour, the Tokyo-Osaka-Nagoya Quattro Tour. They released their second album Beam of Light  in May 2008. In an interview with Rockin'On Japan magazine in June 2012, One Ok Rock said they did not count this album as an album, but rather as a part of growing up as a band. When they made the album, they had not been in the right mood, but felt that they had to make it to grow as a band. The band came up with many sound sources and ended up making a punk album. The album's confused origins were the reason why they would not play any songs from Beam of Light in live performances until now. Shortly after releasing Beam of Light, later they performed a gig at Shibuya AX.

On April 5, 2009, Alex was arrested for groping the leg of a twenty-one-year-old female student on a train. He admitted to the charges and the case was settled out of court. The band's next single, "Around the World Shounen", which was planned for a May 6 release as the theme song for the TV drama GodHand Teru, and their nationwide tour were both cancelled. In May 2009, it was announced that One Ok Rock would continue on without Alex, who went back to the United States. Toru took his place as lead guitar, and the band re-arranged their songs to be played for one guitar.

2010–2012: Niche Syndrome, music festivals, and Zankyo Reference 
With the new four-member formation, One Ok Rock released the single "Kanzen Kankaku Dreamer" on February 3, 2010. The song peaked at number nine on the Oricon Singles Chart in Japan. After four months, the band released their fourth studio album titled Niche Syndrome. Released on June 9, 2010, the album peaked at number three on the Billboard's Top Albums Sales chart. For the promotion of Niche Syndrome, One Ok Rock embarked on the This is my own judgement! tour initially in five Zepp music halls across the nation in 6 days, starting Sendai, Osaka, Nagoya, Fukuoka and ending in a 2-day concert in Tokyo. The second part the tour took place at sixteen different venues until December 11, 2010. They held a final performance in Nippon Budokan, Tokyo on November 28, followed by the release of a concert DVD This is My Budokan?! on February 16, 2011. On August 6, 7 and 8, One Ok Rock headlined Rock in Japan Festival and Summer Sonic Festival, followed by Rising Sun Rock Festival, Monster Bash, Treasure05X, Mad Ollie, Countdown Japan 2010/2011, and Radio Crazy. The band supported Pay Money to My Pain in their 2010 Stay Real tour, The Hiatus in their Anomaly 2010 tour, and Totalfat in their Overdrive tour.

On February 16, 2011, the band released the single "Answer is Near", later, from April to June of the same year, they performed the tour Answer is Alive 2011. After that, One Ok Rock released their first double A-side single "Re:make/No Scared" on July 20, 2011, one of which's songs was the main theme for the Black Rock Shooter: The Game video game. The band's fifth album, Zankyo Reference, was released on October 5, 2011. One Ok Rock announced fourteen dates between November and December 2011 for the Zankyo Reference Tour. The band also announced their final tour for this album as a two-day concert in Yokohama Arena on January 21 and 22, 2012. This was their first time playing in Yokohama Arena, the biggest venue in Kantō region. The concert was sold out with more than 24,000 attendees. Later, the documentary of the Zankyo Reference Tour and the performance from the second night in Yokohama Arena was released on Blu-ray and DVD on May 30, 2012.

During 2011, One Ok Rock headlined many music festivals, including Jisan Valley Rock Festival in South Korea. In July the band headlined Setstock 2011, followed by Rock in Japan Festival, Rising Sun Rock Festival, Summer Sonic Festival, Monster Bash, Sky Jamboree, and Space Shower's Sweet Love Shower. At the end of the year, they headlined Radio Crazy and Countdown Japan once more.

The band declared their first overseas tour in Start Walking The World on May and June 2012, covering Japan, South Korea, Taiwan, and Singapore. They headlined Rock in Japan Festival on the main stage, as well as Summer Sonic 2012, and headlined Oga Namahage Rock Festival, Rising Sun Rock Festival, and Sweet Love Shower. Their next single, "The Beginning", was chosen as the theme song for the live action movie adaptation of the Rurouni Kenshin manga, and was released on August 22, 2012, reaching number 2 on the Billboard Japan Hot 100. Later, "The Beginning" won two awards - Best Rock Video from the 2013 MTV Video Music Awards Japan and a second award as Best Your Choice in Space Shower Music Video Awards.

2013–2014: Jinsei×Boku=, Fool Cool Rock, and Worldwide Tour 
On January 9, 2013, One Ok Rock released the double single "Deeper Deeper/Nothing Helps", and hit 2nd place on the Oricon charts. The song "Nothing Helps" was used for the Japanese version of the video game DmC: Devil May Cry, and "Deeper Deeper" was used for the commercial of Suzuki Swift Sport in Japan. Their sixth full-length album Jinsei×Boku= was released on March 6, 2013, and managed to reach second place on the Oricon weekly chart. In October 2013 the band went on their first tour outside Asia and visited Europe for five concerts. Four out of the five concerts in Europe were sold out almost immediately.

On January 12, 2014, their album producer John Feldmann related that One Ok Rock had already started recording their forthcoming album. In February 2014 they visited the US to hold two concerts in New York and Los Angeles and added two more dates in Philadelphia and Toronto in May. They also performed at Rock on the Range in Columbus, Ohio, their first festival outside Asia. On May 16, the documentary film about their last Europe and Asia Tour, Fool Cool Rock, was released and played for a limited time of four weeks at select theaters. The film, directed by Hiroyuki Nakano, was released on DVD and Blu-ray in November 2014, with promotional screenings in Bangkok, Thailand, and Hong Kong.

In June and July 2014 they joined Vans Warped Tour 2014 and performed in eighteen cities in North America. On July 30, 2014, One Ok Rock released the double A-side single "Mighty Long Fall/Decision", and while "Mighty Long Fall", was the theme song for the movie sequel of Rurouni Kenshin entitled  Rurouni Kenshin: Kyoto Inferno, the song "Decision" is the theme song for their documentary film Foo Cool Rock. The music video for "Decision" released on August 20, 2014, is a compilation of footage from their tours in Europe and Asia. In September 2014, the song "Heartache" became part of the Rurouni Kenshin: The Legend Endss soundtrack. Subsequently, in September 2014, One Ok Rock held a two-day stadium concert in Yokohama Stadium in front of 60,000 people called Mighty Long Fall Live at Yokohama Stadium 2014. This was their first time performing in a stadium.

One Ok Rock announced U.S., South American and European tours in late 2014. They performed at Knotfest, in both Japan and the United States, with an additional two dates for the United States in October. At the end of October 2014, the band started their first tour in Latin America visiting five countries. On November 27, they were a guest performer in Hoobastank's Japan tour and returned their tour, this time in Europe, performing in ten more countries in December.

 2014–2016: 35xxxv and international success 
On January 12, 2014, their album producer John Feldmann tweeted that One Ok Rock had already started recording their new album. Their first single from the forthcoming album, "Mighty Long Fall", was the theme song for the movie sequel of Rurouni Kenshin. One Ok Rock released the new single "Mighty Long Fall/Decision" on July 30, 2014. The song "Decision" is also the theme song for their documentary film FOOL COOL ROCK. The music video for "Decision" released on August 20, 2014, is a compilation of footage from their tours in Europe and Asia. They also revealed the theme song for another movie sequel of Rurouni Kenshin entitled "Heartache".

In September 2014, One Ok Rock held a two-day stadium concert in Yokohama Stadium in front of 60,000 people called "Mighty Long Fall Live at Yokohama Stadium 2014". This was their first time performing in a stadium. They played more than twenty songs, including three new songs and one cover of A Thousand Miles by Vanessa Carlton.

One Ok Rock announced U.S., South American and European tours in late 2014. They performed at Knotfest, in both Japan and the United States, with an additional two dates for the United States in October. They visited Chile, Argentina, Brazil, Peru and Mexico for South America in November and France, Italy, Switzerland, Germany, Denmark, Sweden, the Netherlands, Belgium, United Kingdom and Russia in December. They performed alongside Ghost Town in the US and UK, and with Tonight Alive and Mallory Knox for most dates in Europe. On November 27, they were a guest performer for Hoobastank's Japan tour.

On October 9, 2014, the band announced that next album would be released in February 2015. The official website of the band was redesigned along with this announcement. Around December 16, 2014, the band revealed the cover and name of their new Japanese upcoming album, 35xxxv. The album peaked at #11 on Billboards Heatseekers Albums. This chart is for new and upcoming musicians, which is usually a stepping stone towards the Billboard 200. On the same week, it peaked at number 43 on Billboard Independent Albums. Then it peaked at number 23 on the Billboard Hard Rock Albums Chart and reached #1 on the Billboard World Albums Chart.

In April 2015, they opened alongside Finch for Yellowcard's U.S. tour. Following that, the band returned to Japan for their extensive album tour starting from May to September. The final concerts included bands like Issues and Against the Current. In July 2015, One Ok Rock officially announced that they have signed with Warner Bros. Records and planned to re-release 35xxxv as a deluxe edition containing all English tracks on September 25, 2015. The band was set to have a North American tour in fall 2015 with a few selected cities as headlining artists, but will spend the majority of their time as the opening act for All Time Low and Sleeping with Sirens. One Ok Rock also toured Europe and Asia to promote their album.

On October 17, 2015, 35xxxv (Deluxe Edition) debuted at No. 20 on Billboards Heatseekers Albums and its highest peak position is at No. 17.

One Ok Rock returned to Japan for their One Thousand Miles Tour 2016 concert along with All Time Low and PVRIS. In early 2016, it was announced that One Ok Rock would open for Issues and Crown the Empire on the Monster Energy Outbreak Tour in to promote their English album in the U.S. They also continued to tour in Europe at different music festivals and solo shows.

On March 11, 2016, the band released a new song "Always Coming Back" that was featured in NTT Docomo's phone commercial series, "Kanjou no Subete / Nakama". In mid-2016, One OK Rock joined 5 Seconds of Summer on the first North American leg of their Sounds Live Feels Live World Tour.

To commemorate the 10th anniversary of My Chemical Romance's album The Black Parade, Rock Sound announced a special cover album, including One Ok Rock. The band covered the first track, "The End".

On September 10 and 11, the band held a special live concert at Nagisaen, Shizuoka, Japan for a crowd of 110,000 spectators. One Ok Rock also announced the digital single release of "Taking Off" on September 16, 2016, under Fueled by Ramen. The song was used as a theme song for the Japanese film Museum starring Shun Oguri. The movie debuted on November 12, 2016. Later at a special live concert, Taka announced that their 8th studio album would be released the following year following an album tour.

On October 8, Sum 41 released the Japanese edition of their album, 13 Voices, including the song "War" featuring Taka. Deryck Whibley from Sum 41 mentioned to Alternative Press Japan that "It was great to collaborate with Taka on our new song called War. I am a huge fan of his voice and of One Ok Rock and I think that our voices work very well together".

 2016–2017: Signed to Fueled by Ramen and Ambitions 
After signing with Fueled by Ramen on September 11, 2016, they released the lead single "Taking Off" from their eighth album, Ambitions. The Japanese version of the album was released on January 11, 2017, with A-Sketch. The English version of the album was released on January 13, 2017, with Fueled by Ramen. Ambitions features collaborations from Avril Lavigne on the Japanese version of the album, Alex Gaskarth from All Time Low on the English version of the album, and the Australian band 5 Seconds of Summer on both. Alternative Press declared the collaboration song "Jaded" (with Alex Gaskarth) as the best collaboration song of 2017.

On November 13, 2016, NHK (Nippon Hōsō Kyōkai, a Japan Broadcasting Corporation) held ONE OK ROCK 18 Festival (18 FES) where One Ok Rock and 1,000 youths (17 – 19 years old from the whole country) sang together on one stage.

On November 18, 2016, One Ok Rock released "Bedroom Warfare", the second single from the album. The third single, "I was King", was released on December 15, 2016.

On January 1, 2017, One Ok Rock opened a special site "WORLD AMBITIONS", in celebration of Ambitions released on January 11, 2017. WORLD AMBITIONS is a website that visually represents images of "hope" being shared and spread from users around the world through the website and Twitter/Instagram. People from all over the world can upload pictures with yellow in it, symbolizing hope and connecting them all. Users can share their images through SNS (Twitter, Instagram). On January 9, 2017, the band released their single "We Are".

In January 2017, the band went on their North American tour for 6 concerts. From February to May 2017, they will held 32 concerts in Japanese arenas.

On February 9, 2017, the band released the limited CD single "Skyfall", which was only sold during the "Ambitions" Japan Tour at the show venues. The CD contains 3 songs: "Skyfall" (featuring MAH from SiM, Masato Hayakawa from Coldrain, and Koie from Crossfaith), "Right by your side", and "Manhattan Beach".

On May 2, 2017, it was announced that One Ok Rock would open Linkin Park's One More Light Tour in North America for 4 dates and in Japan for 3 shows. Later on July 21, 2017, it was announced that their North American Tour got cancelled because of Linkin Park frontman Chester Bennington's suicide on July 20, 2017, a week before their shows; while Linkin Park's final leg in Japan was cancelled on October 3, 2017. One Ok Rock paid tribute to Chester Bennington by covering Linkin Park's song "One More Light" on their live performances.

 2018–2020: Eye of the Storm 
On February 16, 2018, they released their first single of 2018, "Change". The song was made by vocalist Taka alongside the band's producer for a HondaJet commercial. The band remained relatively silent throughout the rest of the year (with the exception of embarking on their Ambitions Dome Tour in Japan, announced the previous year), until the announcement of a small, four date tour with an orchestra in Japan in late October, as well as a small European tour in December.

On November 23, the band announced their forthcoming album, Eye of the Storm. The second single, "Stand Out Fit In", considered the lead single for the album, was released the same day with a music video. "Change" was also featured on the album. On February 1, 2019, the band released the third and final single from the album, "Wasted Nights". The song will serve as the theme song for the film Kingdom. American singer-songwriter Kiiara is the sole guest feature on the album on the track "In the Stars", which serves as the theme song for the film Fortuna's Eye.

The band toured with Waterparks and Stand Atlantic in a headlining North American tour during February and March to support "Eye of the Storm". They also supported Ed Sheeran on the second Asian leg of the ÷ Tour throughout April and early May, and performed a headlining tour in Europe throughout the rest of May, with support from dream pop band Anteros and producer Dan Lancaster. One Ok Rock played a short U.S. tour of Oregon, California, and Mexico during July, during which they also played the Vans Warped Tour. Rock band Weathers served as support during this tour. One Ok Rock performed an arena tour of Japan from September 2019 to January 2020. In March 2020, the band toured Australia with American pop rock band Set It Off and Australian pop punk band Stateside serving as support. The band was set to finish their tour with an Asian leg spanning from April to July 2020. However, on March 17, 2020, the band announced that the tour dates would be postponed due to the COVID-19 pandemic, with the shows ultimately being cancelled.

Eye of the Storm was released in Japan on February 13, 2019, via A-Sketch and outside of Japan on February 15, 2019, via Fueled By Ramen.

 2020–present: Luxury Disease and 10969 Inc. 
On August 24, 2020, the band announced a livestreamed, stadium concert, entitled Field of Wonder, which took place at the Zozo Marine Stadium in Chiba City, Japan on October 11, 2020. The concert was broadcast to worldwide audiences, and was the band's first performance since the beginning of the COVID-19 pandemic.

In 2021, the band left Amuse, Inc. and established their own management agency 10969 Inc. The band provided a soundtrack song for Rurouni Kenshin: The Final  titled "Renegades". The song was co-written by Ed Sheeran and Coldrain's frontman Masato Hayakawa and was released on April 16, 2021, via Fueled By Ramen for both Japanese and International versions. The band provided a new song for Rurouni Kenshin: The Beginning in 2021, titled "Broken Heart of Gold" and released a trailer of the movie featuring the song on their official YouTube channel. The song was released on May 27, 2021.

On July 31, 2021, One Ok Rock held a livestreamed acoustic performance titled "Day to Night Acoustic Session" from the Kawaguchiko Stellar Theater in Yamanashi, Japan. They played more than ten songs, including a cover of Hikaru Utada's 1999 song "First Love".

On October 21, 2021, One Ok Rock released the documentary, Flip a Coin, on Netflix, their first to be hosted by them. The next day, on October 22, the band released the single, "Wonder" through Fueled By Ramen.

On June 21, 2022, it was announced that they will release a new single, "Save Yourself", on June 24 along with the music video. One Ok Rock announced their new album, Luxury Disease, will be available on September 9, 2022.

On August 28, 2022, they announced another single "Let Me Let You Go" to be released on August 30 along with a Live Documentary Video.

On September 6, 2022, the band released a new single, "Vandalize", which was simultaneously announced to be featured as one of the ending themes for the video game Sonic Frontiers. One Ok Rock announced tour as the opening act for Muse's Will of the People World Tour along with Evanescence in United States and Canada in 2023.

On December 11, 2022, the band announced Luxury Disease Japan tour for 2023 performing in all Domes in Japan.

 Artistry 
One Ok Rock's influences are Linkin Park, Foo Fighters, Good Charlotte, Ellegarden, and the Used. The group's initial idea began when Yamashita wanted to start a rock band and invited Kohama to join him. Good Charlotte's influences are seen on their first album, Zeitakubyō; while the Foo Fighters' influences can be seen on their second and third albums, Beam of Light and Kanjō Effect.

In their sixth album Jinsei×Boku=, they expressed how this album was influenced by Linkin Park's and Coldrain's screaming and yell-rapping. Their seventh album 35xxxv, was produced along with producer John Feldmann. The album managed to reach first place on the Oricon Album weekly ranking, making it the first time the band had reached the top of the list. And, in addition,  it was the first One Ok Rock's album to be released in a separate English language international edition in addition to the Japanese version. Their eighth album Ambitions also topped the Oricon Album weekly ranking, and incorporated more pop-rock.

Band membersCurrent members  – vocals (2005–present), occasional rhythm guitar (2009–present)
  – guitar, vocals (2005–present)
  – bass guitar, backing vocals (2005–present)
  – drums, percussion, backing vocals (2006–present)Former members  – guitar, backing vocals (2005–09)
  – drums, percussion (2005–06)Timeline'''

 Discography 

 Zeitakubyo (2007)
 Beam of Light (2008)
 Kanjō Effect (2008)
 Niche Syndrome (2010)
 Zankyo Reference (2011)
 Jinsei×Boku= (2013)
 35xxxv (2015)
 Ambitions (2017)
 Eye of the Storm (2019)
 Luxury Disease (2022)

Filmography

 Fool Cool Rock! One Ok Rock Documentary Film (2014)
 One Ok Rock: Flip a Coin (2021)

Tours and concerts

As a headliner
Japan
 Shredder in the World (世の中シュレッダー) (2007)
 One Ok Rock Tour 2008 "What Time Is It Now?" (2008)
 One Ok Rock 2009 "Emotion Effect" Tour (2009)
 "This is my own judgment" Tour (2010)
 Answer is aLive Tour (2011)
 One Ok Rock 2011–2012"残響リファレンス"Tour (2011–2012)
 "The Beginning" Tour (2012)
 One Ok Rock 2013 "人生×君="Tour (2013)
 One Ok Rock 2014 "Mighty Long Fall at Yokohama Stadium" (2014)
 One Ok Rock 2015 "35xxxv" Japan Tour (2015)
 One Thousand Miles Tour (2016)
 One Ok Rock 2016 Special Live in Nagisaen (2016)
 One Ok Rock 2017 "Ambitions" Arena Tour (2017)
 One Ok Rock 2018 "Ambitions" Japan Dome Tour (2018)
 One Ok Rock with Orchestra Japan Tour 2018 (2018)
 One Ok Rock 2019-2020 "Eye of the Storm" Japan Tour (2019–2020)
 One Ok Rock 2020 "Field of Wonder" at Stadium Live Streaming (2020)
 One Ok Rock 2021 "Day to Night Acoustic Sessions" at Stellar Theater (2021)
 One Ok Rock 2023 "Luxury Disease" Japan Dome Tour (2023)

International
 "Start Walking The World Tour" (2012)
 "Who are you?? Who are we??" Tour (2013)
 One Ok Rock 2014 South America & Europe Tour (2014)
 One Ok Rock 2015 "35xxxv" North America, Europe, Asia Tour (2015–2016)
 One Ok Rock European Tour 2016 (2016)
 One Ok Rock 2017 "Ambitions" World Tour (2017)
 One Ok Rock "Eye of the Storm" North America, Europe Tour (2019)
 One Ok Rock Eye of the Storm World Tour 2019 -US & Mexico- (2019)
 One Ok Rock "Luxury Disease" North America Tour (2022)

As a co-headliner
 Knotfest in US  (2014)
 Vans Warped Tour  (2014)
 Rock on the Range in US  (2014)
 Soundwave in Australia  (2015)
 Aftershock Festival in US  (2015)
  Monster Energy Outbreak Tour  (2016)
 Rock am Ring and Rock im Park in Germany  (2016)
 Download Fest in France and UK  (2016)
 Pinkpop Fest in Netherlands  (2016)
 Self Help Fest in US  (2016)
 Reading and Leeds Festivals in England  (2017)
 Czad Festiwal in Poland  (2017)
 Vans Warped Tour in US  (2019)
 Good Things in Australia  (2022)

As an opening act & Special guest
 Hoobastank Japan Tour  (2014)
 The Smashing Pumpkins Sidewave in Australia  (2015)
 Yellowcard Tour  (2015)
 All Time Low "Back to the Future Hearts Tour"  (2015)
 5 Seconds Of Summer "Sounds Live Feels Live Tour" in North America  (summer 2016)
 Ed Sheeran "Divide Asia Tour"  (2019)
 Muse "Will of the People World Tour''" in US and Canada  (2023)

Awards and nominations

References

External links

 
 
 One Ok Rock at BBC Music

 
2005 establishments in Japan
A-Sketch artists
Japanese alternative rock groups
Japanese pop punk groups
Japanese rock music groups
Musical groups established in 2005
Fueled by Ramen artists
Musical quartets
Musical groups from Tokyo
Japanese emo musical groups
English-language musical groups from Japan